The Bishop of Gloucester is the ordinary of the Church of England Diocese of Gloucester in the Province of Canterbury.

The diocese covers the County of Gloucestershire and part of the County of Worcestershire. The  see's centre of governance is the City of Gloucester where the bishop's chair (cathedra) is located in the Cathedral Church of the Holy and Indivisible Trinity.

The bishop's residence is Bishopscourt, Gloucester; very near the Cathedral.

The office has been in existence since the foundation of the see in 1541 under King Henry VIII from part of the Diocese of Worcester. On 5 August 2014, Martyn Snow, the suffragan Bishop of Tewkesbury, became acting bishop of Gloucester.

On 26 March 2015, it was announced that Rachel Treweek was to become the next bishop of Gloucester (and the first woman to serve as a diocesan bishop in the Church of England); she legally became the bishop of Gloucester with the confirmation of her election on 15 June 2015.

List of bishops
Chronological list of the bishops of the Diocese of Gloucester.

(Dates in italics indicate de facto continuation of office)

Assistant bishops
Among those who have served as assistant bishops in the diocese were:
1892–?: Samuel Marsden (also Assistant Bishop of Bristol after 1897), former Bishop of Bathurst
19291954 (d.): James Palmer, former Bishop in Bombay
Lumsden Barkway, former Bishop of St Andrews, Dunkeld and Dunblane, undertook some bishop's duties in Gloucestershire around 1954
1955–1956 (res.): Ronald O'Ferrall, Rector of Cranham; former Bishop in Madagascar and Assistant Bishop of Derby

Among those who have served as (honorary) assistant bishops in retirement have been:
20052020 (d.): Patrick Harris, retired Bishop of Southwell
20052011 (res.): Peter Vaughan, retired Bishop suffragan of Ramsbury
20052008 (d.): Jonathan Bailey, retired Bishop of Derby

References

External links
Bishop of Gloucester's homepage

 
1541 establishments in England
Gloucester
Gloucestershire-related lists